The Little Mermaid is a 2018 American live-action fantasy-adventure film inspired by the 1837 Hans Christian Andersen story of the same name. It is directed and written by Blake Harris, co-directed by Chris Bouchard, and produced by Armando Gutierrez and Robert Molloy.

The film was released on August 17, 2018, by AMC Theatres and it grossed US$2.61 million on a budget of $5 million.

Plot
Eloise tells her two granddaughters a version of The Little Mermaid in which a mermaid princess is tricked by a wizard who steals her soul, and forced to live a life away from her ocean home enslaved to the wizard for eternity. When the girls say they do not believe the story is real, their grandmother begins a tale of a girl she knew who met a mermaid.

Cam, a young reporter, writes a letter while his niece, Elle, plays outside. Elle has an undiagnosed condition with no cure. She starts coughing and Cam carries her inside before going to work. His boss assigns him to investigate a man in a circus, Locke, who claims to have mermaid healing water. Cam hopes this water can cure Elle.

Cam and Elle visit the circus in Mississippi, where they meet a mermaid trapped in a glass tank. The next day, Cam questions several people who have taken Locke's mermaid water; none of them have actually been cured of their ailments. After determining conclusively that the healing water is a fraud meant to dupe the gullible, Cam assumes the mermaid is likewise a hoax.

Cam and Elle take a walk in the woods, where they meet the mermaid again. She introduces herself as Elizabeth and explains that she has legs when it is low tide. Back at the circus, Locke holds the vial which contains Elizabeth's soul and Elizabeth abruptly leaves Cam and Elle. Cam sneaks back into the circus and overhears a conversation between Locke and his henchman, Sid. He follows the sound of Elizabeth's singing to her tent before he's found by Locke and Sid and forced to leave.

Thora, a fortune teller, and Ulysses, a circus performer, help Cam and Elle take Elizabeth's soul and release her from her tank. They escape to the ocean, defeating Locke in the process. Elizabeth regains her soul and heals Elle, telling her that all she needs is a swim when she is feeling sick. Cam and Elizabeth share a farewell kiss before Elizabeth swims away.

Cam files the story, revealing that the mermaid is real, as well as details of Locke's scams and cruelty, skeptical that anyone will believe him, despite this, he is determined to tell the truth.

Eloise finishes this story and begins coughing. She announces it is time for a swim and goes outside, her surprised granddaughters following behind.

Cast
 William Moseley as Cam Harrison, a reporter and Elle's uncle
 Poppy Drayton  as Elizabeth, the mermaid
 Loreto Peralta as Elle, Cam's niece
 Armando Gutierrez as Locke, a wizard who has enslaved Elizabeth
 Shirley MacLaine as Eloise, Rose and Lily's grandmother
 Gina Gershon as Peggy Gene, a woman who claims to be cured of madness
 Shanna Collins as Thora, a fortune teller who possesses paranormal powers, including telekinesis and the ability to stop time
 Chris Yong as Ulysses
 Jo Marie Payton as Lorene
 Tom Nowicki as Sid, Locke's main henchman
 Lexy Kolker as Lily, Eloise's granddaughter
 Claire Crosby as Rose, Eloise's granddaughter
 Jared Sandler as Billy Bob
 Hunter Gomez as Johnny Boy

Production
The film was originally titled A Little Mermaid. Filming took place in Savannah, Georgia, in 2016.

Marketing and release
A trailer for the film debuted in March 2017 and generated over 30 million views over two weeks.

In May 2017, it was reported that the film had been picked up for distribution by Netflix.

On December 1, 2018, the film was released on Netflix.

Reception

Gary Goldstein of Los Angeles Times wrote:

References

External links
 
 
 

Films shot in Savannah, Georgia
English-language Netflix original films
2018 films
2010s fantasy adventure films
American fantasy adventure films
Films set in Mississippi
Films based on The Little Mermaid
Circus films
2018 directorial debut films
2010s English-language films
2010s American films
Films about mermaids
Films about shapeshifting
Films about magic